Theodore D. Moustakas (born ) is a materials physicist. He holds the title of Distinguished Professor of Photonics and Optoelectronics at the Boston University Department of Electrical & Computer Engineering. He was named a Fellow of the Institute of Electrical and Electronics Engineers (IEEE) in 2014 for his contributions to the epitaxial growth of nitride semiconductors. He has been granted 62 patents.

Biography
Moustakas was born in a small village in Greece. 
In 1964, he completed a Bachelor of Science (B.Sc.) in Physics from Aristotle University. Moustakas attained a doctoral degree in 1974 at Columbia University, with his thesis titled Transport and recombination properties of amorphous arsenic telluride thin films.

Co-inventor of blue LED

Role
In August 1991, Moustakas published details on a buffer-layer process for growing high-purity GaN on a substrate using a two-step MOCVD process. Several months later, Shuji Nakamura, then a doctoral student at the Nichia Corporation, published similar results in a different journal and later used the process to create a blue LED. Moustakas had also filed a patent (the so-called buffer-layer patent) at the time of his discovery. As the process Moustakas developed is indispensable in creating blue LEDs, and since he was the first to come up with the process, he is considered to have co-invented the blue LED.

Nobel prize controversy
In 2014, the Nobel Prize in Physics was awarded to Isamu Akasaki, Hiroshi Amano, and Shuji Nakamura "for the invention of efficient blue light-emitting diodes which has enabled bright and energy-saving white light sources". However, as Moustakas' role in discovering the blue LED are significant, there has been controversy about that he did not receive recognition and was left "in the dark" by the Nobel Committee. Following the announcement, then Managing Director of Boston University's Office of Technology Development Tweeted

Despite this Moustakas and some of the co-inventors remain colleagues, and at the 2016 BU ECE symposium Nakamura gave a speech about blue LEDs, also honoring Moustakas.

Patent infringement lawsuits

2015
In 2015, Boston University won 13 million dollars in a patent infringement suit, where it was found that three companies had infringed on one of Moustakas' patents related to blue LEDs, used in various cell phones, tablets, laptops, and lighting products. The patent in question is titled Highly insulating monocrystalline gallium nitride thin films (US5686738A), and was filed in 1995 and granted in 1997.

2002
In 2002, Boston University was involved in a legal dispute with Nichia Corporation, centered around some of Moustakas' patents related to a GaN synthesis process for blue LEDs. Cree Lighting, Inc., a North Caroline company, had exclusively licensed some of these patents. Nichia had alleged that Cree was involved in trade secret theft, to which Cree and BU jointly sued Nichia for infringing on Moustakas' so-called buffer-layer patent. In the same year on November 13, the companies entered into a patent cross-license agreement, and a settlement.

RayVio company
Moustakas and others created a company focusing on UV LED technology, called RayVio.

See also
 GaN
 Blue LED

References

Fellow Members of the IEEE
Living people
21st-century American engineers
Year of birth missing (living people)
American electrical engineers
Boston University faculty